Jamshedpur LGBTQ Pride has been held in Jamshedpur, Jharkhand, India since 2018. The pride march is organised by Utthaan JSR.

History 
The first pride march in Jamshedpur was held on April 7, 2018. The march started from Basant Talkies in Sakchi and ended at Jubilee Park. Around 75 people took part in the march. The march had participants from West Bengal, Odisha and other parts of Jharkhand. The marchers demanded removal of Section 377 of the Indian Penal Code.

The second Jamshedpur LGBTQ Pride was held on April 7, 2019. 50-60 people participated in the event. The march started from Bistupur in front of P&M Hi-tech City Centre and ended at Gopal Maidan. The march was supported by Mumbai based organisation Humsafar Trust. A street play to spread awareness about decriminalisation of Section 377 of the Indian Penal Code was organised by Srijan Bharti.

See also 
 Homosexuality in India
 LGBT culture in India

References 

Pride parades in India
LGBT rights in India
Jamshedpur
2018 establishments in Jharkhand
Recurring events established in 2018